The 1920 Tennessee Volunteers football team (variously "Tennessee", "UT" or the "Vols") represented the University of Tennessee in the 1920 Southern Intercollegiate Athletic Association football season. Playing as a member of the Southern Intercollegiate Athletic Association (SIAA), the team was led by head coach John R. Bender, in his third year, and played their home games at Waite Field in Knoxville, Tennessee. They finished the season with a record of seven wins and two losses (7–2 overall, 5–2 in the SIAA). The Volunteers offense scored 243 points while the defense allowed 40 points.

Schedule

References

Tennessee
Tennessee Volunteers football seasons
Tennessee Volunteers football